The 1989 World Rowing Championships were World Rowing Championships that were held from 2 to 10 September 1989 at Lake Bled near Bled in SR Slovenia, Yugoslavia.

Medal summary

Men's events

Women's events

Medal table

References

Rowing competitions in Slovenia
World Rowing Championships
1989 in Yugoslav sport
World Rowing Championships
Rowing Championships
1989 in Slovenian sport
Sport in Bled
September 1989 sports events in Europe